The Saqqawists (Saqāwīhā) were an armed group in Afghanistan who were active from 1924 to 1931. They were led by Habibullāh Kalakāni, and in January 1929, they managed to take control of the capital of the Kingdom of Afghanistan, Kabul, reestablishing the Emirate of Afghanistan. Following military reversals in the Afghan Civil War (1928–1929), they were forced out of the capital in October 1929. Saqqawist activity ended in 1931.

Name 
The name derives from Kalakani's nickname, Bacha-e Saqaw (literally son of the water carrier).

The period in which Kalakani ruled Kabul, 17 January to 13 October 1929, is known as the "Saqqawist period".

History 

Habibullāh Kalakāni began resistance against the government of Amanullah Khan in 1924, after he deserted from the Royal Afghan Army, which at the time was fighting against the Khost rebellion. Kalakani began a life of banditry, since he considered the occupations common among the Kuhdamanis, like viticulture and selling firewood, to be beneath him, reasoning that these could hardly ever provide wheat bread for his table. Instead, he began to rob caravans and nearby villages. He was joined by Sayyid Husayn and Malik Muhsin, as well as others, totaling 24 in all. For three years, they lived in mountain caves, venturing out during the day to rob and hiding out at night, all the time fearful of government retaliation. Sometime later, Kalakani fled to Peshawar where he was a tea seller and a petty thief.

In November 1928, while a Shinwari revolt was occurring in Jalalabad, the Saqqawists besieged Jabal al-Siraj, beginning the Afghan Civil War. On 17 January, they took Kabul, beginning what is known as the "Saqqawist period". In October 1929, a series of intense battles succeeded at forcing Kalakani to retreat into Kabul, and subsequently into the Arg. On 13 October 1929, the Arg was captured by forces loyal to Mohammed Nādir Khān, ending the Saqqawist period. During the reign of Nadir, the Saqqawists attempted another uprising, the Kuhistan rebellion, which was crushed within a week. The last Saqqawist holdout, Herat, fell to the Afghan government in 1931.

Membership and support 
The Saqqawists saw widespread support among Afghanistan's Tajik population. The Saqqawist attack on Kabul in January 1929 was supported by the religious establishment as a way to reverse Amanullah's reforms. However, Habibullāh Kalakāni "did not have the caliber to serve as the head of the state" and lost conservative support once in power. On 14 April 1929, Fayz Muhammad estimated the Saqqawists to number 20,000.

Ideology 
Kalakani declared himself to be a "defender of Islam", denouncing opponents as kuffar. The Saqqawists also had some support amongst Muslim conservatives.

International relations 

Despite taking control of Kabul, The Saqqawist government of Afghanistan was unable to obtain any diplomatic recognition. Nonetheless, the Saqqawists allied themselves with the Basmachi movement, allowing them to operate in Northern Afghanistan, and revoking the "Pact of Neutrality and Non-Aggression" that Afghanistan had signed with the Soviet Union following the end of the Urtatagai conflict, which obligated Afghanistan to restrain Basmachi border raids.

Human rights abuses 
During the Afghan Civil War, there were incidents of rape and looting among Saqqawist troops. One such incident took place on 28 June 1929, when Saqqawists attacked the Hazara settlement of Qalah-i Karim, looted anything movable and drove off livestock.  Another incident, which took place on 23 July 1929, was described by the contemporary Afghan historian Fayz Muhammad as follows:

References 

1924 establishments in Afghanistan
1931 disestablishments in Afghanistan
Organizations established in 1924
Organizations disestablished in 1931
Rebel groups in Afghanistan
Conservatism in Afghanistan
Afghan Civil War (1928–1929)